Sidney Julius Marcus (February 5, 1928 – October 27, 1983) was a Georgia (U.S.) legislator from Atlanta's 26th district, now the 106th district, who served in the Georgia House of Representatives from 1968 until his death in 1983. He served on several committees: Health and Ecology, on which he was chairman; Ways and Means; and Rules. For several years, Marcus was chairman of Fulton County delegation. He was also an unsuccessful candidate for Mayor of Atlanta in 1981, defeated by Andrew Young. He was a noted Atlanta politician, and active in the Jewish community. His accomplishments included helping to stop the I-485 freeway which threatened several intown neighborhoods (leading to the park named in his honor). Sidney Marcus attended Atlanta public schools and graduated from the University of Georgia in 1948, as a member of Zeta Beta Tau fraternity. He was a 1955 graduate of the Emory University School of Law. Marcus married Charlotte Glyck of Waycross, GA, and they had three children, Robyn, Bradley and Beth.

Monuments 
 Sidney Marcus Boulevard, which runs 1.1 km (0.7 mi) from Piedmont Road (S.R. 237) to the Buford Highway Connector (S.R.13) in Atlanta, is named in his honor.
 Sidney Marcus Park, Cumberland Road at Cumberland Circle, Morningside, Atlanta, GA.
 Sidney Marcus Auditorium, Georgia World Congress Center
 On the Right Track, campaign show at the Fox Theatre

Sources 

SIDNEY J. MARCUS PAPERS, University of Georgia
Sidney Marcus Park
Microsoft MapPoint North America 2004
Daily news, October 1981
ZBT Fraternity at U of FL
APS Notable Graduates
Morningside / Lenox Park Association
Atlanta Jewish Times

1928 births
1983 deaths
Politicians from Chicago
Politicians from Atlanta
University of Georgia alumni
Jewish American state legislators in Georgia (U.S. state)
Democratic Party members of the Georgia House of Representatives
Emory University School of Law alumni
20th-century American politicians
20th-century American Jews